Djoenie Steenvoorde (born 1 May 1981, Seoul) is a Dutch basketball player who played for Dutch league eredivisie clubs Omniworld Almere, Rotterdam Challengers and Eiffel Towers Den Bosch during the 2003-2012 seasons.

References

External links
 eurobasket.com profile

1981 births
Living people
Dutch men's basketball players
Dutch Basketball League players
Basketball players from Seoul